Anemone is a genus of flowering plants in the buttercup family Ranunculaceae.

Anemone may also refer to:

Biology

 Wood anemone, a common name for various flowering plants in genus Anemonoides
 Rue anemone, a common name for Thalictrum thalictroides, a flowering plant in the buttercup family Ranunculaceae
 Sea anemone, a type of marine invertebrate
 Tube-dwelling anemone, another type of marine invertebrate
 Hippolytidae, anemone shrimp

Music

 "Anemone", a song by the Brian Jonestown Massacre on their album Their Satanic Majesties' Second Request
 "Anemone", a song by L'Arc-en-Ciel on their album Clicked Singles Best 13
 "Anemone", a song by ClariS
 "Anemone", a song by Band-Maid on their album World Domination
 "Anemone", a song by Joywave
 Anemone (band), from Montréal, Quebec

Other uses

 Anemone, a French radar used in the Super Etendard Modernise and the Dassault-Breguet/Dornier Alpha jet
 Anemone (Eureka Seven), one of the characters in the anime series Eureka Seven
 Anémone (1950–2019), a French actress
 Anémone Marmottan (born 1988), French World Cup alpine ski racer
 , the name of more than one US Navy ship
 , a steamer used by the Union Navy during the American Civil War
 , a US Navy patrol vessel in service from 1917 to 1919

See also
 Anemonoides, a genus of "anemone-like" flowering plants
 Anemonastrum, a genus of flowering plants that are "somewhat like anemone"

Animal common name disambiguation pages